The Dublin City Exiles are an Irish rugby league team from Dublin, Ireland. The Exiles play in the Leinster Conference of the Irish Elite League. They play their home games at Lakelands Park in Terenure.

History 
The Dublin City Exiles were formed in 2000 by a number of Australian expatriates based in Dublin. Rugby League Ireland (the governing body for the development of rugby league in Ireland) was formed the same year, and in the first RLI season the Exiles reached the 2001 All Ireland final. The club, competing in the Leinster Conference of the Ireland National League, went on to win the 2002 and 2003 All Ireland finals.

Over the years, a number of players from the club have received caps for (or been named in training squad for) the Ireland men's national rugby league team. As of April 2019, the Exiles are the only rugby league team in Dublin.

In February 2022, the exiles became the first Irish team to win a Challenge Cup tie.

Honours
 Irish Elite League (2): 2002 & 2003

References

External links
 Website of Dublin City Exiles (dublincityexilesrlfc.blogspot.com)

2000 establishments in Ireland
Australian diaspora in Europe
Diaspora sports clubs
Irish rugby league teams
New Zealand diaspora in Europe
Rugby clubs established in 2000
Rugby league teams in County Dublin
South African diaspora
Sports clubs in Dublin (city)